Roni Taharlev (Hebrew: רוני טהרלב) is an Israeli figurative painter.

Biography
Roni Taharlev was born in Kibbutz Yagur. She is the daughter of the Israeli lyricist Yoram Taharlev and the poet and author Nurit Zarchi.

Art career

In 2012 a self-portrait of Taharlev was included in the BP Award exhibition at the National Portrait Gallery in London and was also exhibited in Scotland and Wales. In 2019 her painting Not This Light, the Other Light was selected for the major exhibition The Moon, from Real to Imaginary Voyages at the Grand Palais in Paris, a ‘first’ for an Israeli painter. In 2019 she also had a solo exhibition at the Herzliya Museum for Contemporary Art, titled White Ravens.

Taharlev teaches at the Bezalel Academy of Arts and Design in Jerusalem.

Taharlev's is a figurative painter whose  work references classical European painting but with a contemporary twist. Her paintings explore fundamental experiences of identity and selfhood in modern Western society, such as the objectification of women, the limits of gender binaries, and the cultural aspiration for determinism versus ambivalence and play.

Exhibitions

Catalogues
 La Lune. Du voyage réel aux voyages imaginaires, Galleries Nationales du Grand Palais, Paris, 2019 (French)
 White Ravens 2015-2019, solo exhibition catalogue, Herzliya Museum for Contemporary Art, 2019
 Undressing the Nude, Ben Gurion University, 2018, solo exhibition catalogue
 Delft in Blue and White, Tel Aviv Museum, 2014, curator Doron Luria, group exhibition catalogue
 BP Award Catalogue, National Portrait Gallery, London, 2012
 Blood Relation, Bernard Gallery, 2009, solo exhibition catalogue
 The Great Illustrators Book, Israel Museum, 2004 (Hebrew)

Grants & Awards
 2019 - Artis Art Fund, grant to support work in Berlin
 2012 - BP Award, National Portrait Gallery, London
 2002 - The Oskar Hendler Prize, Israel
 2000 - The Ben Isaac Prize, The Israel Museum, Jerusalem
 1983 - The America Israel Fund Award for Young Artists

See also
Israeli art

References

External links
 25 May — 24 Aug 2019 at The Herzliya Museum of Contemporary Art in Herzliya, Israel
 Israeli Artist Roni Taharlev
 Roni Taharlev
 Roni Taharlev
 Exposition Lune au Grand Palais

Living people
20th-century Israeli painters
21st-century Israeli painters
20th-century Israeli women artists
21st-century Israeli women artists
Academic staff of Bezalel Academy of Arts and Design
Israeli women painters
1964 births